Isidoro Carini (7 January 1843, in Palermo – 25 January 1895, in Rome) was an Italian religious, teacher, historian and palaeographer.

Biography
He attended the Jesuit college of Palermo and wanted to enter that Order, but was hindered by his father Giacinto Carini, who had participated, as battalion leader, in the action of the Thousand in Sicily, being wounded in Palermo. Pia Carini, Isidoro's younger sister, married the archaeologist Alfonso Bartoli and Alfonso 's sister, Maria, married Alfonso Battelli: Giulio Battelli, paleographer and historian, was born from the marriage.

Isidoro Carini was trained in the Congregation of the oratory. In 1865 he founded the weekly L'Amico della religion, which ceased after the popular uprisings of Palermo in September 1866. In 1868 he was ordained a priest and in the same year he founded the weekly Ape iblea. The following year he founded the bi-weekly La Sicilia Cattolica, which absorbed the previous one. In 1874 he was among the founders of the Sicilian Society for Homeland History.

In 1876 he was appointed professor of paleography at the University of Palermo. He devoted himself to the edition of the Greek and Arab diplomas, present in the Sicilian archives. He was the first to be a lecturer in the School of paleography and historical criticism - as the Vatican School of diplomatic and archival paleography was then called - established by Pope Leo XIII, at the Vatican Secret Archive, with motu proprioof 19 May 1884. His appointment was as sub archivist of the Holy See and consultant of the Commission of Cardinals. In 1888, Isidoro Carini founded the Roman Society for Biblical Studies. In 1890, he was appointed by Pope Leo XIII as "first custodian" of the Vatican Apostolic Library.

On 26 January 1893 he became a member of the Turin Academy of Sciences.

References

Bibliography
Giulio Battelli,  vol. 20, Roma, Istituto dell'Enciclopedia Italiana, 1977

External links
Isidoro Carini at Internet Archive

19th-century Italian Roman Catholic priests
Academic staff of the University of Palermo
Vatican City people